Salinicola salarius is a Gram-negative, moderately halophilic, piezophilic bacterium that requires pressures of 102 MPa to grow. The species was first isolated from a salt water sample from Anmyeondo, Korea and was formally described in 2007. 
S salarius cells are aerobic, Gram-negative, non-spore-forming rods (0.8–0.9x1.3–1.7 μm) that form yellow, smooth, translucent, circular colonies with entire edges. The oxidase- and catalase-positive cells are motile and possess lateral/polar flagella. Growth occurs at 10–45 °C (optimally at 25–30 °C) and at pH 5–10 (optimum pH 7–8). The strain is able to grow at salinities between 0 and 25% NaCl (optimum 10–20% NaCl).

S.I. Paul et al. (2021) isolated and identified salt tolerant Salinicola salarius from marine sponges (Niphates erecta, Hemimycale columella) of the Saint Martin's Island Area of the Bay of Bengal, Bangladesh.

Biochemical characteristics of Salinicola salarius 
Colony, morphological, physiological, and biochemical characteristics of Salinicola salarius are shown in the Table below.

Note: + = Positive, – =Negative, V =Variable (+/–)

References

Oceanospirillales
Piezophiles